Jackass Mountain is a mountain in the North Cascades of the Cascade Range in southwestern British Columbia, Canada, located  southeast of Lytton and  south of Mount Lytton.  It is named for the muletrains that ventured north to the Cariboo gold fields; apparently some did not make it over the bluff and perished in a fall, hence the name.

References

External links
 Point of Interest "Jackass Mountain" BC Archives

Two-thousanders of British Columbia
Canadian Cascades
Fraser Canyon
Kamloops Division Yale Land District